Babington may refer to:

Babington family
Babington (surname)
Babington, Somerset, England, a small village between Radstock and Frome
Babington House, an example of Georgian architecture in Somerset, England
Babington Academy, a school in Leicester, England
Babington's tea room, a traditional English tearoom in Rome
Babingtonite, mineral named after William Babington
Babington Path, a road in Hong Kong

See also
Babington Plot, a 16th-century conspiracy in England
Babbington